William A. Haseltine (born October 17, 1944) is an American scientist, businessman, author, and philanthropist. He is known for his groundbreaking work on HIV/AIDS and the human genome.

Haseltine was a professor at Harvard Medical School, where he founded two research departments on cancer and HIV/AIDS. He is a founder of several biotechnology companies, including Cambridge Biosciences, The Virus Research Institute, ProScript, LeukoSite, Dendreon, Diversa, X-VAX, and Demetrix. He was a founder chairman and CEO of Human Genome Sciences, a company that pioneered the application of genomics to drug discovery.

He is president of the Haseltine Foundation for Science and the Arts, and founder, chairman, and president of ACCESS Health International, a not-for-profit organization dedicated to improving access to high-quality health worldwide. In 2001 he was listed by Time Magazine as one of the world's 25 most influential business people, and in 2015 by Scientific American as one of the 100 most influential leaders in biotechnology.

Early life and education
Haseltine has devoted his career to improvements in human health.

He was born to a scientific family. His grandfather was an engineer, his father a PhD physicist. He was raised at the Naval Ordnance Test Station at China Lake in the Mojave Desert of California, surrounded by weapons scientists and engineers. His older sister Florence received both a Ph.D. in biophysics and an MD, and his younger brother Eric a PhD in neurobiology. His younger sister Susan became a specialist in computer systems.

Haseltine's early life is described in the book Rapture, by Brian Alexander (1d), and in Gene Masters by Ingrid Winkelgren (3d).

Haseltine graduated from Sherman E. Burroughs High School in 1962. In 1966 he received a BA in chemistry from the University of California, Berkeley, and in 1973 a Ph.D. in biophysics from Harvard University.

Training in biomedical research
As a pre-medical undergraduate student majoring in chemistry, he published two scientific papers, one on the composition of the Martian atmosphere in Science  and a second on the use of isotope shifted lasers for communication to outer space in Applied Physics Letters. He was elected to Phi Beta Kappa his junior year and graduated at the top of his class. Upon graduation he decided to learn as much about science as possible towards creating new ways to treat and cure disease.

At Harvard University he worked under the direction of James D. Watson, co-discoverer of the structure of DNA, and Walter Gilbert, who later received a Nobel prize for developing a method to determine the sequence of DNA. Work in this laboratory gave him an excellent grounding in the tools of what was then the new field of molecular biology. As a graduate student he worked on fundamental aspects of regulation of expression of genes. He elucidated the means by which bacteria signal the shift from growth when food is abundant to maintenance when food is scarce, the topic of his PhD thesis titled Magic Spot and the Stringent Response.

During his graduate studies, Haseltine was also active in his opposition to the war in Vietnam. He wrote several articles on the use of technology in the Vietnam War and broke the "Agent Orange Defoliation" story in a cover article in the New Republic. He worked with the American Friends Service Committee to create a resource center for those who wished to understand their own communities’ involvement in the war and lectured against the war throughout the country for several years. He was a founder of "Science for the People".

In 1973, Haseltine joined the laboratory of David Baltimore at the Massachusetts Institute of Technology as a post-doctoral fellow. There he began to work on fundamental aspects of how retroviruses known to cause cancer in animals reproduce.  His work, in collaboration with several other scientists, provided unexpected insights into the process of retrovirus replication and was recognized as innovative in publication in leading scientific journals.  This work prepared him for research on human disease and retroviruses, both important later in his career.

He interrupted his postdoctoral studies at MIT briefly the summer of 1973 to serve as a visiting professor at the University of Copenhagen Faculty of Health and Medical Sciences, where he continued his work on the regulation of gene expression in bacteria.

Cancer research

In 1976, he joined the faculty of the new comprehensive cancer center, the Dana Farber Cancer Institute affiliated with Harvard Medical School. He became a professor in the Harvard Medical School Department of Pathology and shortly thereafter a professor in the Cancer Biology Department of the Harvard School of Public Health. He founded the equivalent of two academic departments: the Laboratory of Biochemical Pharmacology devoted to work on cancer cause and treatment, and the Division of Human Retrovirology, dedicated, understanding and finding treatments for HIV/AIDS. As a professor, he published more than two hundred research articles in leading scientific journals and edited several books. He mentored dozens of graduate students and postdoctoral fellows, many of whom have gone on to successful careers of their own at Harvard and elsewhere. He taught advanced level courses in cancer biology and HIV/AIDS to graduate and medical students. For many years he taught a course "Biology and Social Issues" for Harvard non-science undergraduates and was a tutor and thesis advisor for several generations of Harvard undergraduate biochemistry students.

Retrovirus replication continued to be a focus of his early research as a Harvard professor. This research led to fundamental insights including the "end to end jumping" of the initial copy of the genome. He then began to focus on two related issues: how retroviruses induce cancer in animals, and whether or not retroviruses cause cancer and other diseases in humans. His laboratory discovered that the key determinant of the ability of retroviruses, those that do not carry oncogenes, to cause cancer is their ability to rapidly replicate in cells that themselves grow rapidly. This allows the retrovirus to implant nearby a cellular oncogene. Another impact for science of this work was the discovery that small genetic elements upstream of the transcription start site, now called enhancers, determine the rate at which genes are copied into RNA. This discovery provided a key insight into factors that distinguish one cell type from another.

In 1978, responding to the needs of physicians treating cancer, Haseltine began to focus on improving chemotherapy by deepening the understanding of how drugs and radiation used to treat cancer actually worked. Many anti-cancer treatments killed rapidly growing cancer cells by damaging DNA. The Haseltine lab was among the first to apply the new techniques of DNA sequencing to the understanding of DNA damage and its repair. These studies led to a deeper insight into the action of many anti cancer treatments and formed the basis for the creation of the Division of Biochemical Pharmacology. The discoveries informed the design of new approaches to the treatment of head and neck cancer by the president of the Dana Farber Cancer Institute, Emil Frei. Ultimately the team led by Dr. Frei was successful increasing 5-year survival of patients with head and neck cancer to 80% from 20%. The division also had the mission to train a new generation of physicians/scientists specializing in cancer pharmacology.

The laboratory extended this work to study the process by which cancer causing chemicals and radiation cause the changes to DNA which can lead to cancer.  The work revealed a new and unexpected form of sun-induced DNA damage, called the 6-4 lesion, is responsible for most mutations in sun exposed skin that cause cancers including melanoma.

Human T Cell Leukemia Virus

Haseltine was one of the very few scientists in the late 1970s who continued to work on the concept that retroviruses played an important role in human diseases. This idea once popular in the late 1960s and early 1970s was abandoned by many after a decade or more of a futile search for human retroviruses by laboratories around the world. Haseltine, working with a few other scientists, thought that human retroviruses would behave differently from those that affect laboratory animals such as mice and would behave more like those that cause cancer and immunological deficiencies in non-laboratory animals. These viruses seem to disappear after early infection, the disease appearing only after several years. Haseltine devoted part of his laboratory to the study of retroviruses in these animals in the hope that they would provide insight into human disease. In 1978 he helped to design a special containment laboratory at the Dana Farber Cancer Institute to work on these viruses should they be discovered, a step later essential for his work on HIV/AIDS.

In 1979 the first human retrovirus to cause a human disease was discovered, the Human T cell leukemia Virus (HTLV).  HTLV is sexually transmitted from men to women, by women to their children and by blood transfusions. The disease, T-cell leukemia, arises decades after infection. Haseltine and his laboratory discovered that HTLV carried a novel gene called the transactivator X (now called tax). Over the next few years, Haseltine and his colleagues showed that tax is the gene responsible for the cancers. Haseltine spent the summer of 1983 as a visiting professor at the University of Kyoto working with Japanese scientists studying the Human T cell Leukemia virus, a virus endemic to Japan.

HIV/AIDS research and public policy

The work HTLV prepared Haseltine for work on AIDS. Before the AIDS epidemic was identified, Haseltine already had the expertise and the facilities to study human retroviruses.  He first learned of the new disease from colleagues in late 1981. In early 1982 he and a few other scientists who were working on HTLV formed a small working group to identify the cause of the new disease. They met regularly every 4–6 weeks from early 1982 to 1985. With help from the Centers of Disease Control, this group formed the hypothesis that AIDS was caused by a human retrovirus similar to HTLV. They proposed to use methods similar to those used to isolate the HTLV virus to find this new virus. These methods were successfully used to isolate the virus, now called the Human Immunodeficiency Virus (HIV) and to demonstrate that it is the cause of AIDS.

For the next ten years Haseltine devoted his efforts to finding ways to diagnose, treat and prevent HIV/AIDS. He was one of the first to recognize the danger the disease posed and to accurately predict the magnitude of the epidemic. His views were considered highly controversial as summarized in a book, The Myth of Heterosexual Aids: How a Tragedy Has Been Distorted by the Media and Partisan Politics by Michael Fumento. In a retrospective article titled "20 years ago in Discover: Misunderstanding AIDS", Discover Magazine credited Haseltine as the only one of 20 scientists interviewed in the mid-1980s that correctly understood that transmission of HIV/AIDS was unlikely to be restricted to anal sex and shared needle use, but could spread in the heterosexual community and had the potential to become a global pandemic.

Haseltine's approach to the epidemic was threefold:

 To conduct laboratory studies to understand the virus in enough depth to allow pharmaceutical and biotech companies to discover means to diagnose, treat, cure and prevent the disease, realizing that new knowledge was needed to combat the epidemic
 To stimulate the creation of  new institutions to conduct research on the epidemic, similar to those devoted to cancer research, realizing that the epidemic would grow to significant proportions and demand decades of research.
 To raise public awareness of the disease both to support research and assure human and sensitive support for those infected, realizing that tens of millions of people would be affected by the disease.

The first goal was achieved by understanding the structure and function of the virus.  Haseltine's laboratory, working in collaboration with two other groups, determined the complete sequence of the viral genome and discovered the genes that specify the virus capsid, polymerase, protease, ribonuclease H, integrase and envelop genes.  The first application of this knowledge was to design a fragment of the virus envelope protein that could be used to accurately detect antibodies to HIV in those infected, forming the basis of an accurate diagnostic test. This protein fragment was used by Cambridge BioSciences (Later named Cambridge BioTech) to develop a rapid test for HIV infection that could be used at home. It was only in 2012 that the US FDA approved a similar home HIV test kit.
Haseltine and his laboratory quickly showed that damage to any of the viral genes that specify the virus capsid, polymerase, protease, ribonuclease, integrase and envelope genes killed the virus and therefore that proteins specified by each gene were good targets for anti-viral drugs.  Over the next several years his laboratory isolated each of the genes and their proteins in pure form and developed methods that were used by the pharmaceutical companies to discover new anti viral drugs. The first HIV specific protease inhibitor Nelfinavir, was developed as a part of a three way collaboration between the Haseltine laboratory, Cambridge BioSciences, a company Haseltine and his colleagues created, and Agouron Pharmaceuticals. The combination of an HIV polymerase inhibitor such as AZT and an anti protease drug lead to the first long term survival of those infected with HIV. Haseltine proposed the use of combination chemotherapy, targeting multiple drugs against different viral proteins as the basis for effective therapy. Today those ideas have proven out; the pharmaceutical industry has developed more than forty drugs that inhibit the HIV polymerase, protease, integrase, and envelope proteins. Combinations of these drugs have transformed HIV infection from a near universally fatal disease to one that with proper management usually can be successfully treated for decades.

The HIV genome presented several additional mysteries. The virus genome contained regions that might specify as yet unknown proteins.  The Haseltine laboratory discovered a novel transacting protein and a second protein, both required for virus replication. They named the transactivator tat  and the second protein art; the latter was renamed rev.  He predicted that drugs that target these proteins will also be effective in treating the infection. A drug that inhibits the rev protein has been approved by the USA Food and Drug administration for treatment of HIV infection. His laboratory went on to discover additional viral genes and proteins – vpr, vpu, vif, and nef – required for efficient virus growth in some but not all circumstances.  The discoveries were summarized in an article in 1988 in Scientific American.

During this period his laboratory made other scientific observations that helped to understand and control the epidemic. His laboratory showed that dendritic cells that pass back and forth through the mucous membranes of the reproductive tract are carriers transporting HIV into the body to begin the process of infection. Working with a colleague he recruited to study monkey models of the disease, he showed that it was possible to reduce the incidence of maternal child transmission, the first proof that this was possible.
His laboratory was the first to use a weakened form of HIV to introduce foreign genes into cells, laying the foundation for what are now called "lentivirus vectors for gene therapy". The laboratory also created hybrid viruses that carry some monkey and some HIV genes-the so-called SHIV viruses-so that new drugs and vaccines could be developed using primate models.

Haseltine was one of the first to publicly voice skepticism that an anti-HIV vaccine would soon be developed. At the second international HIV/AIDS meeting held in Paris in 1986 he noted that during infection the human immune response is fully activated, antiviral antibody levels are high and cell mediated immunity is fully active, yet the infection proceeds.  Therefore, known vaccine technologies which induce either one or the other or both were unlikely to work. This idea, very unpopular at the time, proved to be prophetic. The conclusion was that efforts to control the disease must rely on diagnosis, treatment and education as a vaccine would not be forthcoming soon.

After ten years of work, the first goal was accomplished. the scientific foundation for a rational approach to the diagnosis and treatment of HIV/AIDS was laid, the necessary tools were at hand. The success of combination anti viral drug treatments today is based on those foundations.

The second goal was to help the creation of new institutions to conduct the research necessary to control the HIV/AIDS epidemic. In the early years of the epidemic there was little money or enthusiasm in the scientific community for such work. The threat of the epidemic was not apparent to most, as for example reflected in the Department of Health and Human Service recommendation to Congress in 1986 that only one million dollars be allocated to the National Institutes of Health (NIH) for HIV/AIDS research. In the late summer of 1986 the actor Rock Hudson fell ill with AIDS in Paris and was airlifted to Los Angeles. Realizing that this might be a moment to begin to build support for HIV/AIDS research, Haseltine enlisted the help of Elizabeth Taylor, with whom he was working in the newly created American Foundation for AIDS Research (AMFAR), and members of the Lasker Foundation. In a six-week period this small group, with the support of Senators Ted Kennedy and Ted Stevens, were able to convince Congress to add about $320 million as a supplemental appropriation to the budget of NIH specifically for HIV/AIDS research (as recounted in the book Rapture). Haseltine was appointed to the council of the National Institute of Allergy and Infectious Disease (NIAID) to help direct how these funds were to be used. Over the next few years funding of HIV/AIDS research grew to about $2 billion per year. These funds have been instrumental in creating a powerful research institutions to control the HIV/AIDS epidemic, institutions which have trained many thousands of scientists and doctors and which continue to seek better ways to treat, cure and prevent the disease. Haseltine played an important early role in the creation of the International Society for AIDS Research, now the International AIDS Society, and was the Founding editor of the scientific journal AIDS Research and Human Retroviruses.

Haseltine then helped design programs to transfer knowledge from academic laboratories to pharmaceutical and biotechnology companies to develop new anti viral drugs. Early on pharmaceutical companies were reluctant to initiate new research programs on HIV/AIDS. Biotechnology companies lacked the necessary funds and expertise for such work. To address this issue, Haseltine suggested that NIAID create a special grant program to encourage pharmaceutical and biotech companies to work on HIV related problems. Under this program a relatively large amount of money was granted to academic scientists provided that their laboratory have a pharmaceutical or biotechnology partner capable of translating knew knowledge to new drugs. The majority of the funds of these grants went to the industry partner to encourage the development of new drug research activities. These co-operative drug development grants led directly to the discovery of the protease inhibitors that changed the course of HIV/AIDS treatment and later to drugs that effectively target the integrase and envelope proteins.

By 1992, only ten years after the AIDS virus was first recognized, the institutions that today guide HIV/AIDS research were created and still endure.

In the early days of the epidemic Haseltine recognized a two-fold problem in public perception. Many, both within and outside of the scientific/medical community, did not believe the epidemic would ever pose a serious threat to populations. Others believed that AIDS patients posed an immediate threat of infection and must avoided. To address this issue Haseltine help to create and guide several different groups. One of the most successful of these was the American Foundation of AIDS Research. Haseltine became the first chairman of the scientific advisory board of AMFAR. The mission was twofold: to make start up grants available for those wishing to begin work on HIV/AIDS and to de-stigmatize HIV/AIDS. Many of today's leaders of HIV/AIDS received their first support from AMFAR. The second goal was to provide a body of scientific and medical experts willing to speak out about the danger and magnitude of the epidemic and to provide a credible reference for those worried about causal transmission- in others words, a group of qualified experts to speak about the real dangers of the disease and to counter unjustified fears. AMFAR continues in this role today.

Haseltine also worked internationally on these issues of public perception. He became an advisor to the AIDS Crisis Trust in Great Britain, a group that worked closely with Princess Diana. Perhaps more than any other person, Princess Diana served to de-stigmatize those with the disease and to defuse fear through her willingness to hug adults AIDS patients and hold AIDS infants. For a time Haseltine also worked with L.I.F.E., a group founded by the designer Valentino to combat HIV prejudice. From 1986 to 1990 Haseltine appeared on many radio and television programs both in and outside the US to warn of the dangers of the epidemic and to de-stigmatize the disease.

Biotechnology

William Haseltine has also had an active career in biotechnology. He is the founder of several companies, an advisor to venture capital groups, and was the founder, chairman, and CEO of a major biotechnology company, Human Genome Sciences. Haseltine's interest in biotechnology and pharmaceutical companies arose from his desire to convert new knowledge into new ways to treat and cure disease.

In 1981 he founded Cambridge BioSciences to create a new generation of animal vaccines. The first product, developed for the French company Virbac, was a vaccine to protect domestic cats from infection by the feline leukemia virus. The company developed an effective vaccine, one that used recombinant viral protein and a novel adjuvant,  Stimulon, to make the vaccine more potent.  It was the first vaccine to protect mammals from a retrovirus infection. Cambridge BioScience also participated in the creation of the first anti-HIV protease drug, Nelfinavir.

In 1987 Haseltine became an advisor to a venture capital company, Healthcare Ventures. Over the next several years together, they founded several biotechnology companies, each working in a different area of science and medicine.

In the late 1980s, Haseltine was asked by several Harvard colleagues to help create their own companies. Among these was ProScript Inc. ProScript discovered the drug Velcade, an inhibitor of the proteosome, that has proved to be an effective treatment for multiple myeloma and other cancers. Haseltine and a colleague also founded LeukoSite Inc. to develop drugs to treat autoimmune diseases. LeukoSite, also initially funded by Healthcare Ventures, acquired ProScript which in turn was acquired by Millennium Pharmaceuticals, the company that successfully brought Velcade to market. Millennium was acquired in 2008 by Takeda Pharmaceutical Company. Today Velcade is an important drug in the treatment of multiple myeloma.

Knowledge of the importance of dendritic cells in HIV infection provided the insight that led to the formation of a company that pioneered immune cell therapy of cancer. Together with Healthcare Ventures, Haseltine formed the company Activated Cell Therapy Inc. to use dendritic cells to treat cancer.  The company was eventually renamed Dendreon Corp. and successfully brought to market the first approved cell-based immune therapy, Provenge, for the treatment of metastatic prostate cancer. Haseltine also was the founder of a company called Diversa. It was originally named Industrial Genome Sciences Inc. The company uses genomics to identify enzymes for industrial and commercial applications.  Diversa changed its name to Verenium Corporation in 2007 and was purchased by BASF Corporation on October 31, 2013. Haseltine and colleagues founded two new biotechnology companies in 2016, X-VAX, and Demetrix.

Human Genome Sciences

In early 1992, Haseltine co-founded Human Genome Sciences. He served as the founding chairman and chief executive officer for the first twelve years of the company.

Haseltine knew from systematic application of knowledge of the HIV genome to drug discovery how powerful the new techniques could be both for fundamental biological discovery and drug development. In fact work with the HIV genome was perhaps the first time primary knowledge of a new organism originated from studies of the genome. The history of HIV/AIDS drug development proved just how useful such information could be. It was in fact the basis for the rapid and successful development of effective anti-HIV drugs.

Haseltine proposed to create a new, large pharmaceutical company that not only would pioneer the development of a powerful new set of tools for drug discovery but also apply these tools to the discovery, development manufacture and sale of its own drugs. To support this vision, which he estimated would take twenty years to effect, he suggested that the company raise money by sharing the rights to the gene discovery tools with other pharmaceutical companies. This idea became the founding vision of the company.

In April 1993, SmithKline Beecham invested in Human Genome Sciences to acquire access to the new tools of genomic discovery. The initial $125 million transaction was at the time the largest funding received by a fledgling biotechnology company. A year later Human Genome Sciences and SmithKline Beecham split another $320 million raised by selling access to the Human Genome Sciences discovery tools to several other pharmaceutical companies, including the Japanese company Takeda, the German company Merck, the US company Schering Plough and the French Company Sanofi.

At the time, the idea that newly isolated human genes of unknown function could prove useful for drug development was widely criticized. Haseltine's experience with HIV taught him that knowledge of the genome without prior knowledge of function was useful and had led to the discovery of new and useful drug targets and new and effective drugs. Haseltine argued that if one new human gene were discovered, the techniques of modern biology would allow its natural function and potential medical use identified. If that were true for one gene, then why not all the human genes? New tools had been developed that allowed what had been tedious hard work of gene isolation and characterization to be replaced by highly automated instruments and the data regarding the structure, tissue and cell location and the results of functional tests to be stored and easily accessed using advanced computer technologies. He summarized these views  with the statement "Genomics is not necessarily Genetics". It was not until the Human Genome Science approach was validated by its own work and  the work of its partners that it was ultimately adopted by the scientific community. Today, the approach pioneered by Human Genome Sciences is one of the principal tools used for the discovery and characterization of novel human genes and as well as the genes of other species.

The gene discovery efforts of Human Genome Sciences were successful. By the fall of 1994 the Institute of Genomic Research working with Human Genome Sciences had isolated and characterized by partial sequence analysis more than 90% of all human genes.  Preliminary information regarding the tissue and cell in which they were expressed as messenger RNA was available and data regarding their expression in normal and disease tissues.

The work of drug discovery then began. Over the next several years Human Genome Sciences initiated clinical trials of several new drugs discovered using genomic methods.
These included a new skin growth factor, Keratinocyte growth factor 2, for the treatment of diabetic ulcers and cancer therapy induced mucositis, vascular endothelial growth factor for the treatment of peripheral limb ischemia, radio-iodinated B Lymphocyte Stimulator (BLyS) for the treatment of multiple myeloma, a monoclonal antibody to treat cancer that recognizes the Trail receptor, and a monoclonal antibody that antagonizes BLyS (belimumab, trade name Benlysta).

Benlysta was approved for the treatment of lupus by the US FDA in 2010. The approval of Benlysta fulfilled the hopes that the new genomic method of drug discovery would lead to the treatment of disease that had resisted prior attempts at treatment. Additionally Human Genome Sciences developed a monoclonal antibody, Abthrax, for the treatment and prevention of Anthrax infections. Abthrax was approved by the FDA and is currently stockpiled by the US government under BioShield BARDA [Biomedical Advanced Research and Development Authority] regulations. Haseltine directed research on an antidote to anthrax immediately following the  anthrax attacks of 2001.

In July 2012, Human Genome Sciences was purchased by Glaxo SmithKline for $3.6 billion. In addition to Benlysta and Abthrax, the purchase gave Glaxo SmithKline exclusive rights to Albiglutide for the treatment of diabetes, and Darapladib for the treatment of coronary artery disease, both were in late stage clinical trials.

Regenerative medicine

Although the term had a prior history, Haseltine is credited with widespread use of the term "regenerative medicine," particularly in the sense that it is used today. After he was briefed on the project to isolate human embryonic stem cells and embryonic germ cells at Geron Corporation in collaboration with researchers at the University of Wisconsin-Madison and Johns Hopkins School of Medicine, Haseltine recognized that these cells' unique ability to differentiate into all the cell types of the human body (pluripotency) opened the door for the first time in history to a new kind of regenerative therapy. At a conference near Lake Como, Italy in 1999, he explained that several new  technologies – including gene therapy, stem cell therapy, tissue engineering, and biomechanical prosthetics – collectively opened up a new ability, to which he applied the term "regenerative medicine" in the way that it is used today: "an approach to therapy that ... employs human genes, proteins and cells to re-grow, restore or provide mechanical replacements for tissues that have been injured by trauma, damaged by disease or worn by time" and "offers the prospect of curing diseases that cannot be treated effectively today, including those related to aging."

Haseltine went on to co-found E-Biomed: The Journal of Regenerative medicine and The Society for Regenerative Medicine to help expand this emerging biotechnology. Haseltine authored several articles that laid out the fundamental structure of the new discipline.

COVID-19
Haseltine opposes the strategy of waiting for "herd immunity." Given that "with around 10% of the country that's become infected, 216,000 people have died, roughly"—as he noted in a television interview on October 14, 2020—achieving a 60%–70% infection rate would mean “two to six million Americans dead—not just this year but every year.” He concluded: "Herd immunity is another word for mass murder."
He also warns about the risks that come with a fast-tracked vaccine and pleads for other solutions until a treatment or vaccine can be delivered safely.  On January 4, 2021, he advocated a role for a post-presidency Donald Trump as a vaccine advocate, since he had flipped from his earlier anti-vax position and fast-tracked vaccine development with Operation Warp Speed.

He also is author of A Family Guide to Covid (June 30, 2020), a book developed to explain the coronavirus to young persons.

Government consultant

Haseltine has also served as a consultant to several governments. He was a member of the AIDS Executive Committee of the National Institutes of Health from 1986 to 1992 and served on the Council of the National Institute of Allergy and Infectious diseases from 1987 to 1991. It was during this time that he played a central role in crafting the US response to the HIV/AIDS epidemic. He was also an advisor to the President's Emergency Plan For AIDS Relief. From 1986 to 1990 he served as an informal advisor to the French government on HIV/AIDS. He has advised the governments of France, Germany, Italy, Hungary, India, and Singapore on biotechnology and economic development.

Philanthropy

Haseltine began his career in philanthropy in 2004. He created two charitable foundations: The Foundation for Science and the Arts and ACCESS Health International, both 501C3 corporations. The Foundation for Medical Sciences and the Arts supports both biomedical research and the arts including the visual arts, music, opera and dance. A special focus of the foundation is the creation of works of art and music that interpret discoveries of biology and medicine.

Haseltine is a founder, chairman, and president of ACCESS Health International, an operating foundation devoted to improving access to high quality health worldwide,  both in low and high income countries. This encompasses research, knowledge transfer, implementation support, and health technologies. ACCESS Health has offices in the United States, India, Singapore, the Philippines, mainland China, Hong Kong, Sweden, and the Netherlands. He is the author of the book "Affordable Excellence: The Singapore Healthcare Story: How to Create and Manage Sustainable Healthcare Systems" and co-author of "Improving the Health of Mother and Child: Solutions from India", "Modern Aging," available as an e-book on the ACCESS Health International website, and Aging with Dignity.

Haseltine is an active supporter of several other not-for-profit organizations. In September 2015, he was elected as chairman of the board of the U.S.-China Health Summit. He is a member of the advisory board of the IE University, Madrid, a Lifetime Governor of the New York Academy of Sciences and the board of the New York Academy of Sciences. He is trustee of the Brookings Institution, the FXB Center for Health and Human Rights at the Harvard School of Public Health, the Lee Berger Trust for Paleoanthropology in South Africa, a member of the advisory council on Creativity and Innovation of the NYU-Shanghai University, a member of the Council on Foreign Relations, a member of the Board of AID for AIDS International and a chairman of the International China Ageing Industry Association and the US-China Health Summit. He is a trustee of the Lee R. Berger Foundation for Exploration Trust of South Africa.

He is a patron of the Metropolitan Opera, a patron of the Metropolitan Museum of Art, the Guggenheim Museum, the Museum of Modern Art, and a member of the Patron's Circle of the Asia Society. He is a Member of board of directors of the Young Concert Artists, the Youth Orchestra of the Americas, and the China Arts Foundation and a founder of the new Whitney Museum of American Art.

Personal life
Haseltine is the father of Mara Haseltine and Alexander Haseltine, from his marriage to his first wife Patricia Eileen Gercik. He is currently married to Maria Eugenia Maury, who is the mother of  Karina Correa-Plama, Camila Arria-Maury and Manuela Arria-Maury.

Books 
 Affordable Excellence: the Singapore Healthcare Story;  William A Haseltine. Brookings Institution Press, National University of Singapore Press. (2013)
 Improving the Health of Mother and Child: Solutions from India;  Priya Anant, Prabal Vikram Singh, Sofi Bergkvist, William A. Haseltine & Anita George. ACCESS Health International www.accessh.org. (2014)
 Modern Aging: A Practical Guide for Developers, Entrepreneurs, and Startups in the Silver Market; Edited by Sofia Widén, Stephanie Treschow, and William A. Haseltine. Amazon.com, ACCESS Health International www.accessh.org. (2015)
 Aging with Dignity: Innovation and Challenge is Sweden-The Voice of Care Professionals;  Sofia Widen and William A. Haseltine, Nordic Academic Press. . (2017)
 Every Second Counts: Saving Two Million Lives. India’s Emergency response System. The EMRI Story;  William A Haseltine. Thethys Press India, The Brooking Institution Press. . (2017)
 Voices in Dementia Care;  Anna Dirksen and William A Haseltine, Thethys Press India. . (2018)
 Aging Well;  (2019)
 World Class. Adversity, Transformation and Success and NYU Langone Health  (2019)
 A Family Guide to Covid: Questions and Answers for Parents, Grandparents and Children (2020)
 A Covid Back To School Guide: Questions and Answers for Parents and Students (2020)
 Covid Commentaries: A Chronicle of a Plague, Volumes I and II (2020)
 My Lifelong Fight Against Disease: From Polio and AIDS to Covid-19 (2020)

References

External links
 William A. Haseltine papers, circa 1944-2008 (inclusive), 1962-2008 (bulk). H MS c359. Harvard Medical Library, Francis A. Countway Library of Medicine, Boston, Mass.
 William A. Haseltine Official Website
 ACCESS Health International Official Website

1944 births
Massachusetts Institute of Technology alumni
Harvard University alumni
UC Berkeley College of Chemistry alumni
Harvard University faculty
Living people
American virologists
American health care chief executives
American nonprofit chief executives